Bachir Douadi (born December 11, 1953 in Chelghoum Laïd) is a former Algerian football player who spent his entire career between HB Chelghoum Laïd and JS Kabylie. He was also a member of the  Algeria National Team from 1976 to 1979.

International career
In 1979, Douadi was a member of the Algeria national team that won the bronze medal at the 1979 Mediterranean Games.

Honours

Club
JS Kabylie
Algerian Championnat National (2): 1977, 1980
Algerian Cup (1): 1977

Country
Algeria
1979 Mediterranean Games: Bronze medal

References

1953 births
Algerian footballers
Algeria international footballers
JS Kabylie players
People from Mila Province
Living people
Algeria under-23 international footballers
Mediterranean Games bronze medalists for Algeria
Competitors at the 1979 Mediterranean Games
Association football forwards
Mediterranean Games medalists in football
21st-century Algerian people
20th-century Algerian people